2016 Premier Badminton League (also known as Star Sports Premier Badminton League 2016 for sponsorship reasons) was the first edition of the Premier Badminton League. The season was held from 2–17 January 2016. The opening ceremony was held in Mumbai and the Finals in Delhi. Delhi Dashers (formerly Delhi Acers) became the champions after beating Mumbai Rockets in the final.

Bollywood actor Akshay Kumar was brand ambassador of the league.

Delhi Dashers (formerly Delhi Acers) won the title by defeating Mumbai Rockets 4–3.

Teams 
Six teams participated in the season: 
 Awadhe Warriors
 Bengaluru Topguns
 Chennai Smashers
 Delhi Dashers (formerly Delhi Acers)
 Hyderabad Hunters
 Mumbai Rockets

Delhi Dashers (formerly Delhi Acers)

Mumbai Rockets

Chennai Smashers

Hyderabad Hunters

Bengaluru Topguns

Awadhe Warriors

Schedule
The following is the schedule for 2016 Premier Badminton League. A total of 15 league matches, two semifinal, and 1 final match were played.

Knockout stage

Points Table
Each tie (MP) will have five matches each. Regular Match Win (RMW) = 1 point, Trump Match Win (TMW) = 2 points, Trump Match Lost (TML) = -1 point.

Player statistics

End of the Season Award

References 

Premier Badminton League
Indian Badminton League
Indian Badminton League
Badminton tournaments in India